Euryaplothrips is a genus of thrips in the family Phlaeothripidae.

Species
 Euryaplothrips crassus

References

Phlaeothripidae
Thrips
Thrips genera